NGC 990 is an elliptical galaxy located in the constellation Aries about 153 million light-years from the Milky Way. It was discovered by the German - British astronomer William Herschel in 1786.

See also 
 List of NGC objects (1–1000)

References 

0990
Discoveries by William Herschel
Elliptical galaxies
Aries (constellation)
009890